The 2011 season was Dundalk's third successive season in the League of Ireland Premier Division following promotion in 2008. Altogether, it was the club's 85th season in League of Ireland football. The club was managed by Ian Foster, who was in his second season in charge. The club finished the 36-match season in 7th position having been challenging at the top of the table for the first half of the season. The club also competed in the FAI Cup, League of Ireland Cup, Setanta Sports Cup, and the Leinster Senior Cup. In the Setanta Sports Cup they reached the final, but lost to Shamrock Rovers F.C.

After losing the final, and with the playing budget already being restricted by the club's owner, Gerry Matthews, results subsequently deteriorated as the season drew to a close. Financial losses were mounting, and Matthews decided to relinquish control of the club. Foster's contract expired at the end of the season and he was allowed to leave.

2011 Fixtures and results

Setanta Sports Cup 2011

First Round

First Leg

Second Leg

Dundalk won 6 − 4 on aggregate

Quarter-Finals

First Leg

Second Leg

Dundalk won 2 − 1 on aggregate

Semi−Finals

First Leg

Second Leg

Dundalk won 5−2 on aggregate

Final

Leinster Senior Cup

First Round

League of Ireland Cup

Second Round

FAI Cup

Third Round

League of Ireland Premier Division

League table

2011 squad

2011 pre-season transfers

2011 mid-season transfers

References

 

Dundalk F.C. seasons
Dun